Fort Miller Reformed Church Complex is a historic church on Fort Miller Road, west of US 4 and south of Galusha Island and located at Fort Edward in Washington County, New York.

History 
The church was built in 1816. It began as a two-story, clapboard-sided sanctuary with a four-story bell tower in the Federal style, attached to a carriage and horse shed dated to around 1818–22. A two-story rear wing was added in 1896. The complex also contains a parsonage (c. 1845), custodian/tenant house (c. 1845), and a late 19th-century clapboard barn that the church now uses as rental income property.

It was listed on the National Register of Historic Places in 1996.

References

Reformed Church in America churches in New York (state)
Churches on the National Register of Historic Places in New York (state)
Federal architecture in New York (state)
Churches completed in 1816
19th-century Calvinist and Reformed churches
Churches in Washington County, New York
1816 establishments in New York (state)
National Register of Historic Places in Washington County, New York